The Chailey Heritage Foundation, which was founded as the Chailey Heritage, is an English charity that owns and runs the Chailey Heritage School. It was founded out of the Guild of the Poor Brave Things in 1903 by Dame Grace Kimmins.

The foundation specialises in support of children and young people with complex physical disabilities and health needs - predominantly through the Chailey Heritage School.

At one time the Heritage also owned and ran the Chailey Heritage Marine Hospital near to the village of Tide Mills.

History
See Chailey Heritage School and Chailey Heritage Clinical Services

Trustees

The list of trustees at the close of 2014 is:

William Shelford DL (Chair)
Mike Atkinson (School Governor)
Keith Chaplin (Governor) 
David Crowther 
Dr Elizabeth Green (Governor)
Lucinda Hanbury 
Verena Hanbury MBE, DL (President) 
Chris Jones 
Robin Meyer 
Jane Roberts

Linked organisations
 Futures@Chailey Heritage is the charity's new transition service for young adults with physical disabilities and includes a Life Skills Centre.

References

Further reading

External links
Chailey Heritage Foundation official web site
British Utopian Experiments (Sussex) 1325 - 1945 Scroll to Heritage Craft School 1903

Charities based in East Sussex
Charities for disabled people based in the United Kingdom